The 1948 South Dakota Coyotes football team was an American football team that represented the University of South Dakota as a member of the North Central Conference (NCC) during the 1948 college football season. In their 11th season under head coach Harry Gamage, the Coyotes compiled a 7–3 record (4–1 against NCC opponents), finished in second place out of seven teams in the NCC, and were outscored by a total of 292 to 129. They played their home games at Inman Field in Vermillion, South Dakota.

Schedule

References

South Dakota
South Dakota Coyotes football seasons
South Dakota Coyotes football